The 37th Annual American Music Awards took place on November 22, 2009 at the Nokia Theatre L.A. Live in Los Angeles, California. The nominees were announced on  October 13, 2009. For the first time in history, there was no host for the year's ceremony. Instead, various celebrities introduced the performers similar to the procedure at the Grammy Awards. Taylor Swift won five of six categories she was nominated for. Jay-Z and The Black Eyed Peas both won two awards. Michael Jackson's brother Jermaine Jackson accepted his awards on his behalf.

Performers

Presenters

Kristen Bell
Jason Aldean
Alex Rodriguez
Demi Lovato
Reba McEntire
Pete Wentz
Selena Gomez
Joe Perry
Snoop Dogg
Colbie Caillat
Kris Allen

Sofia Vergara
Julie Bowen
Samuel L. Jackson
Orianthi
Paula Abdul
Drake
Jeremih
Kid Cudi
Dominic Monaghan
Morena Baccarin

Winners and nominees

Controversies

Adam Lambert's performance 
In response to Adam Lambert's performance of his song "For Your Entertainment" at the end of the ceremony broadcast, the Parents Television Council, a conservative television watchdog group, urged viewers to complain to the FCC if living in an area where the performance was shown before 10 p.m. local time. The PTC complained that the performance contained a simulation of oral sex. Lambert's performance reportedly was broadcast around 11 p.m. Eastern and Pacific time, "outside the FCC's usual 6am-10pm time frame prohibiting the broadcast of indecent material". ABC also received about 1,500 telephoned complaints.

In a report by Lambert, he had been scheduled to also perform on fellow ABC programs Jimmy Kimmel Live! and Dick Clark's New Year's Rockin' Eve with Ryan Seacrest 2010 (the latter also being produced by Dick Clark Productions), but found out that these bookings were cancelled, possibly in response to the incident. Neither ABC or Dick Clark Productions confirmed his reports, or confirmed if he was ever booked at all.

Nominations of Michael Jackson 

After his death in June 2009, Michael Jackson was nominated for five posthumous awards: Artist of the Year, Favorite Pop/Rock Male Artist, Favorite Pop/Rock Album (for Number Ones), Favorite Soul/R&B Male Artist and Favorite Soul/R&B Album (also for Number Ones). This move was subsequently criticized by those who felt that the awards committee was piggybacking on the hype of Jackson's death for ratings and media coverage purposes, and that his nomination was unfair to artists who had brought out newer material to equal success, such as Lady Gaga and Taylor Swift. Not helping matters was the fact that Number Ones was a greatest-hits compilation released in 2003 (six years before that year's awards show), and not only had Jackson not released any new material since "One More Chance" (the sole new recording on that album), but he had already won several American Music Awards for the songs featured on Number Ones. LA Times insisted that "if fans thought it was an injustice that Kanye West had the audacity to interrupt Swift accepting a 'Moon Man' at the MTV Video Music Awards, then they should be ready to riot if she's now losing awards to artists who haven't had a new song in nearly a decade." Jackson went on to win four of his five nominations, only losing out on Artist of the Year, which was won by Swift.

References

2009
2009 music awards
2009 in California